Thomas L. Hughes (January 28, 1884 – November 1, 1961) was an American right-handed baseball pitcher for the New York Highlanders (1906–07 and 1909–10) and Boston Braves (1914–18). He was the brother of major league pitcher Ed Hughes.

Career
Hughes attended high school in Salida, Colorado, and was nicknamed "Salida Tom". He led the National League in games (50), saves (9) and games finished (22) in 1915; he led the National League in won-loss percentage (.842) in 1916.  

On August 30, 1910, Hughes took a no-hitter into the 10th inning, before allowing a single to Cleveland's Harry Niles. On June 16, 1916, Hughes successfully completed a no-hitter, against the Pittsburgh Pirates at Braves Field; he struck out future Hall-of-Famer Honus Wagner for the final out.

Hughes' accomplishments include being the Braves franchise career leader in WHIP (1.022) and hits allowed per nine innings (6.77). He helped the Braves win the 1914 World Series. In nine seasons, Hughes had a 56–39 win–loss record, while appearing in 160 games and pitching 863 innings; he had a 2.56 ERA and 476 strikeouts. 

Hughes died in Los Angeles at the age of 77.

See also
 List of Major League Baseball annual saves leaders
 List of Major League Baseball no-hitters

References

Further reading
 </ref>

External links

1884 births
1961 deaths
Major League Baseball pitchers
Baseball players from Colorado
New York Highlanders players
Boston Braves players
Pittsburg Coal Diggers players
Topeka Saints players
Topeka White Sox players
Atlanta Crackers players
Montreal Royals players
Newark Indians players
Rochester Bronchos players
Rochester Hustlers players
People from Fremont County, Colorado
American expatriate baseball players in Canada